Gąsocin railway station is a railway station in Gąsocin, Ciechanów, Masovian, Poland. It is served by the regional rail operator, Koleje Mazowieckie.

The station is located on the eastern edge of Gąsocin village.

Historics

References

Station article at kolej.one.pl

Railway stations in Masovian Voivodeship